Theodore W. Drake (September 2, 1907 – May 25, 2000) was an American cartoonist, graphic artist, and sports artist known for creating the college-sports mascot the Notre Dame Leprechaun.

Drake is probably best remembered for the creation of the Notre Dame Leprechaun, for which he was paid $50. The Leprechaun was first used on the 1964 football pocket schedule and later on the football program covers, and featured on the cover of Time magazine in November 1964.
Ted Drake should also be remembered for creating the Chicago Bulls logo in 1966.
In the early 1950s, Drake was the main graphic artist for the Kukla, Fran and Ollie television puppet show, creating its opening titles along with album covers, newsletters, advertisements, and even Christmas cards.

References

http://content.time.com/time/covers/0,16641,19641120,00.html

External links 

Boardman Comics Monographs #3

Sources
The Spindrift Cartoons: 1943 edited by Matthew H. Gore (Ellendale: Tennessee, 2008).

1907 births
2000 deaths
American comics artists
American cartoonists
Logo designers
University of Notre Dame people
Film and television title designers